Thou Shalt Not Steal is a 1917 American silent drama film directed by William Nigh and starring Virginia Pearson, Claire Whitney and Eric Mayne. It was based on the story Le Dossier n° 113 by Émile Gaboriau.

Synopsis
An American woman comes under pressure to marry a British aristocrat to help out her financially-struggling father, although she really love's her father's secretary.

Cast
 Virginia Pearson as Mary Bruce
 Claire Whitney as Madeleine
 Eric Mayne as Henry Bruce
 Mathilde Brundage as Mrs. Bruce
 John Goldsworthy as Lord Haverford
 Robert Elliott as Roger Benton
 Martin Faust as Paul Lechmere
 Lem F. Kennedy as Detective Farrell
 Danny Sullivan as The Reporter
 Mary Foy as Mrs. Jones 
 Victor De Linsky as The Valet
 W.H. Burton as The Servant

References

Bibliography
 Solomon, Aubrey. The Fox Film Corporation, 1915-1935: A History and Filmography. McFarland, 2011.

External links
 

1917 films
1917 drama films
1910s English-language films
American silent feature films
Silent American drama films
Films directed by William Nigh
Fox Film films
1910s American films